The 2012 Subway Fresh Fit 500 was a NASCAR Sprint Cup Series stock car race that was held on March 4, 2012 at Phoenix International Raceway in Avondale, Arizona. Contested over 312 laps, it was the second race of the 2012 season. The race was won by Denny Hamlin for the Joe Gibbs Racing team. Kevin Harvick finished second, followed by Greg Biffle in third.

Report

Background

Phoenix International Raceway is one of five short tracks to hold NASCAR races; the others are Richmond International Raceway, Dover International Speedway, Bristol Motor Speedway, and Martinsville Speedway. The first two turns are banked from 10 to 11 degrees, while the final two turns are banked from 8 to 9 degrees. The front stretch, the location of the finish line, is banked at three degrees. The back stretch, nicknamed the 'dogleg', varies from 10 to 11 degree banking. The racetrack has seats for 76,800 spectators.

Before the race, Matt Kenseth led the Drivers' Championship with 47 points, and Dale Earnhardt Jr. stood in second with 42 points. Greg Biffle and Denny Hamlin followed in third and fourth with the same amount, two ahead of Jeff Burton and three ahead of Paul Menard in fifth and sixth. Kevin Harvick with 37 was one point ahead of Carl Edwards, as Joey Logano with 36 points, was one ahead of Mark Martin three ahead of Clint Bowyer and Martin Truex Jr. In the Manufacturers' Championship, Ford was leading with nine points, three points ahead of Chevrolet. Toyota, with 4 points, was one point ahead of Dodge in the battle for third. Jeff Gordon is the race's defending winner.

Results

Qualifying

Race results

Standings after the race

Drivers' Championship standings

Manufacturers' Championship standings

Note: Only the top five positions are included for the driver standings.

References

NASCAR races at Phoenix Raceway
Subway Fresh Fit 500
Subway Fresh Fit 500
Subway Fresh Fit 500